The Duets is a studio album by American jazz pianist Mulgrew Miller and Danish bassist Niels-Henning Ørsted Pedersen. The album was recorded in Copenhagen on the Bang & Olufsen label and released in 1999. The record features famous compositions by pianist Duke Ellington as well as two originals by bandmembers. Their duo later became a trio with the occasional inclusion of drummer Alvin Queen in 2000.

Background
In 1999–2000, Pedersen had the opportunity to make a studio recording to celebrate Duke Ellington's 100th birthday. The session was initially planned as a piano-and-bass duo, so NHØP chose Miller, whom he had never played with before. From that occasion on, they played together and had an affinity both as men and musicians. They opted for a repertoire based on the historic 1941 Duke Ellington–Jimmy Blanton duets. In 2000, NHØP and Miller recorded another album and toured around the world, commemorating Duke Elington's 100th birthday.

Track listing

Personnel
Band
Mulgrew Miller – piano 
Niels-Henning Ørsted Pedersen – bass

Production
Ib Skovgaard – producer 
Niels Erik Lund – engineer 
MHI Partners – booklet design
Peter H. Larsen – executive producer
Jordi Sunol – executive producer
Hans P. Folmann – executive producer
Jan Persson – photography

References

1999 albums
Mulgrew Miller albums